Ewa or EWA may refer to:

Places 
 Ethiopia
 Ewa (woreda)

 Nauru
 Ewa District, Nauru

 United States
 Eastern Washington, the portion of the state of Washington east of the Cascade Range
 ʻEwa Beach, Hawaii, a census-designated place
 Ewa District, Hawaii, an ancient Hawaiian district of Oahu

Other uses 
 Ewa (given name)
 Eldercare Workforce Alliance
 Ewa Air, a French airline in Mayotte
 Ewa reactor, Poland's first research nuclear reactor 
 Marine Corps Air Station Ewa, a former air station in Hawaii
 Ewa, a sailing vessel later renamed Norda

See also